The Centre of Geographic Sciences (COGS) is located in the village of Lawrencetown, Nova Scotia.

History
COGS traces its history to 1948 when the Nova Scotia Land Survey Institute (NSLSI) was established by Major J.A.H. Church (retired) as a training institution for survey and map production. NSLSI became a world leader in geomatics education during the 1970s and 1980s as it evolved into incorporating then-revolutionary technologies such as remote sensing and geographic information systems (GIS). The institute moved into its current campus during this period in the 1970s.

In 1986, NSLSI was renamed the College of Geographic Sciences (COGS) as a publicly funded training college under an act of the Nova Scotia House of Assembly. The name was considered to better reflect the diversity of geographic sciences taught at the NSLSI.

In 1988, the provincial government undertook a much-needed reform to its training colleges and created the Nova Scotia Community College (NSCC) system the following year. While still a separate college, COGS was administratively placed within the NSCC umbrella.

In 1998 NSCC created the Annapolis Valley Campus by administratively combining the geographically separate campuses at Lawrencetown and Middleton. All geomatics advanced diploma programs were grouped under the Centre of Geographic Sciences (COGS), of which the majority are delivered at the Lawrencetown site (as the former Lawrencetown campus is now called).

Organization
COGS is divided into three departments:

 Geomatics
 Information Technology
 Applied Geomatics Research Group (AGRG)

Programs
COGS offers 1-year advanced diploma programs in the following disciplines (a Bachelor's degree or higher in any discipline from a recognized University is required, although a Bachelors in geography or computer science is a common background for many students):

 Advanced Diploma in Geographic Sciences (GIS concentration)
 Advanced Diploma in Geographic Sciences (Remote Sensing concentration)
 Advanced Diploma in Geographic Sciences (GIS for Business concentration)
 Marine Geomatics (a 2-year diploma from COGS may also be acceptable, depending on marks)

COGS also offers 2-year diploma programs in the following disciplines (graduation from high school is a pre-requisite):

 Diploma in Geographic Sciences (Cartography concentration)
 Diploma in Geographic Sciences (Planning concentration)
 Diploma in Geographic Sciences (GIS concentration)
 Diploma in Geographic Sciences (Remote Sensing concentration)
 Geomatics Engineering Technology (2-year program when combined with the COGS Survey Technician Certificate program)
 Diploma in Information Technology (Systems Management/Networking concentration)
 Diploma in Information Technology (Database Application Programming concentration)

COGS also offers a joint M.Sc. with Acadia University through the Master's of Science in Applied Geomatics. A slightly different arrangement is maintained through the Department of Earth and Environmental Sciences at Acadia where the department accepts a COGS diploma in lieu of two graduate level Geology courses at the university.

The first graduate of the M.Sc in Applied Geomatics was Koreen Millard.

External links
 

Universities and colleges in Nova Scotia
Education in Annapolis County, Nova Scotia